Inverness Airport railway station was opened on 2 February 2023. It is close to the site of the former Dalcross railway station, and is served by ScotRail services between Inverness and Aberdeen. It serves both the namesake airport and the nearby hamlet of Tornagrain.

Proposals 
In June 2006 a proposal was announced to open a new station at Dalcross, which would serve Inverness Airport and also provide park-and-ride facilities for commuters to Inverness, relieving road congestion to the east of Inverness, and so helping to reduce carbon dioxide emissions. There was also the possibility of providing a passing loop, which could not extend further west than the level crossing; a second platform would be built on the south side of the loop. In February 2011, Keith Brown, the Minister for Transport and Infrastructure in the Scottish Government, stated that discussions on the proposed station (and another at ) were being held between Transport Scotland and Network Rail. A £170 million infrastructure upgrade project for the line, funded by Transport Scotland, was announced in 2014.

The station was intended to open by 2019, but construction didn't start as expected in 2017. The station was later slated to open in the first half of Network Rail's Control Period 6, which runs from 2019 to 2024.

Network Rail submitted an updated planning application in December 2020 for a two-platform station with step-free access to both platforms. The airport is also exploring the possibility of relocating its terminal to be beside the planned railway station.

The final plans for station include two platforms, a 64 space car park with 10 electric bays, four disabled bays and cycle paths and two lifts will be installed. A passing loop will be included. Two buses an hour will connect the station with the airport. The Petty level crossing will also close.

Construction 

In October 2021, ground works associated with the station as well as embankments commenced. The main platforms, lift shafts and associated works for the footbridge are projected to begin in early 2022. The station was due to open in December 2022. Opening was further pushed back into early 2023.

Opening 
The station was officially opened on Thursday 2 February 2023 by Jenny Gilruth, the Minister for Transport and pupils from Croy Primary School, Highland with the first journeys by the general public expected the following day.

Services 

All services at Inverness Airport are operated by ScotRail.

Connections 
A half-hourly bus service connects the station to the airport.

References

External links

Railway stations in Great Britain opened in 2023
Railway stations opened by Network Rail
Railway stations served by ScotRail
Railway stations in Highland (council area)
Airport railway stations in the United Kingdom